Sultan Mosque also called Hafsa Sultan Mosque is a 16th-century Ottoman mosque in Manisa, Turkey.

Mosque
The mosque and the adjoining religious complex (külliye) were built in Manisa by Hafsa Sultan, the wife of Sultan Selim I and mother of Suleiman the Magnificent in 1522. The mosque complex consists of the mosque, a madrasa, a hospice, an elementary school, a double bath and a hospital. The mosque is covered by one central dome and has 2 minarets.

Notes

Sources

External links
Hafsa Sultan Complex, Archnet
Photographs of the complex by Dick Osseman

Religious buildings and structures completed in 1522
16th-century mosques
Ottoman architecture in Turkey
Mosques in Manisa
Manisa
Buildings and structures in Manisa Province
1522 establishments in the Ottoman Empire